Alexander Konstantinovich Kott (born 22 February 1973) is a Russian director and screenwriter.

Selected filmography

Director 
  (2006) 8-episode TV series adapted from the eponymous novel by Mikhail Lermontov
 Fortress of War (2010)
 Yolki 2 (2011)
 Yolki 3 (2013)
 Yolki 1914 (2014)
 Test (2014)
 Insight (2015)
 Yolki 5 (2016)
 Yolki 6 (2017)
 Trotsky (2017) TV series
 Spitak (2018)

References

External links

Living people
1973 births
Mass media people from Moscow
Russian Jews
Russian film directors